William Hemple Arthur (April 1, 1856 – April 19, 1936) was a doctor, army officer, and later an American Brigadier general active during World War I.

Early life 
Arthur was born in Philadelphia, Pennsylvania. He received an M.D. from the University of Maryland in 1877.

Career 
In 1881, Arthur was appointed assistant surgeon in the United States Army.

On February 18, 1886 Arthur was promoted to captain-assistant surgeon.

From 1899 to 1900, he commanded a hospital ship during the Spanish–American War. He was with the China Relief Expedition of 1900, then was in the Philippines from 1900 to 1902. He also served assignments in Soldiers Home and Walter Reed Army Medical Center in Washington D.C. until 1915.

In October 1915, Arthur became the third commandant of the Army Medical Department Research and Graduate School until his retirement on December 3, 1918. Arthur was promoted to brigadier general of the National Army with the date of rank from August 7, 1917.

After his retirement, he became the medical director of Georgetown University Hospital.

Death and legacy 
William Hemple Arthur died at the age of eighty on April 19, 1936.

References

Bibliography
 Davis, Henry Blaine. Generals in Khaki. Raleigh, NC: Pentland Press, 1998.  
 Marquis Who's Who, Inc. Who Was Who in American History, the Military. Chicago: Marquis Who's Who, 1975.  
 Who's Who in the Nation's Capital. 1922. Washington, D.C.: Consolidated Pub. Co. 

1856 births
1936 deaths
United States Army generals
American surgeons
Physicians from Philadelphia
19th-century American physicians
20th-century American people
University System of Maryland alumni
Military personnel from Philadelphia
United States Army Medical Corps officers
United States Army generals of World War I
American military personnel of the Spanish–American War
Military personnel from Pennsylvania